Cryptanthus maritimus is a plant species in the genus Cryptanthus. This species is endemic to Brazil.

Cultivars
 Cryptanthus 'Bosun's Mate'
 Cryptanthus 'Green Fountain'
 Cryptanthus 'Marimist Kay'
 Cryptanthus 'Maritime'
 Cryptanthus 'Tiny Treat'

References

BSI Cultivar Registry Retrieved 11 October 2009

maritimus
Flora of Brazil